Agent Cody Banks 2: Destination London is a 2004 American action comedy buddy film and the sequel to the 2003 film Agent Cody Banks. Directed by Kevin Allen and written by Don Rhymer, the film stars Frankie Muniz, Anthony Anderson, Hannah Spearritt and Keith David. The film takes place in London with Cody and his buffoonish adult partner, Derek, trying to recover a stolen software and stop the activation of the government's mind control project.

The film was released in the United States on March 12, 2004, and grossed $28 million worldwide, against its $26 million budget.

Plot
Agent Cody Banks attends summer camp, actually a secret facility for training CIA teenage agents. When a group of CIA soldiers attempt to abduct head counselor Victor Diaz, Cody helps him escape, mistaking the CIA operation for a training exercise. The director informs Cody that Diaz stole disks containing plans for a secret mind-control device, and sends Cody to recapture him.

In the United Kingdom, Cody poses as a summer orchestra student at the Kenworth estate to spy on owner Lord Duncan Kenworth, suspected of working with Diaz, supported by his handler, Derek and Kumar (Rod Silvers), Derek's right-hand man, who are disguised as a chef hired by Lady Josephine Kenworth and a taxi driver respectively. Whilst keeping his mission a secret from his fellow students, Cody sneaks around the estate and confirms that Diaz and Duncan are working together and that they have a working prototype of the mind control device, evidenced when Duncan makes a dog serve drinks and play the piano.

The next day, Cody breaks into a lab owned by Duncan, where he sees the finished device: a microchip inserted as a filling into a tooth cavity by dentist Santiago. Shortly afterward Cody and Derek chase Diaz, armed with a rocket gun, through London streets, but Cody is captured by the Metropolitan Police Service and taken to Scotland Yard. He is later freed by Emily (Hannah Spearritt), a fellow student who, similar to Cody, is actually a British Scotland Yard undercover operative. While Emily buys coffee and soda, henchmen sneak up on Cody, knocking him unconscious by drugging him with spray. They capture him and implant him with the microchip.

Under Duncan, Santiago, and Diaz's influence, Cody meets the CIA director on a London bus who is then also converted. Unknown to them and Cody this is witnessed by Emily from a bus in front. Emily then explains things to Derek that the director alongside Cody is both converted and that they need to get the microchip out of Cody. After knocking out Cody by elbowing him in the face Derek carefully cuts up one of Cody's gadgets, exploding Mentos mints, into a precisely minuscule amount to safely remove it. The group later realizes Diaz's plan: to implant all of the world leaders, who are all in London for a G7 summit at Buckingham Palace, effectively giving him control of the world. He tries to do something to stop him from controlling the world including London but, constantly fails.

Deducing that with the CIA director under Diaz's control, they may be put on a most wanted list, Cody, Derek, and Emily infiltrate the party before the summit. There, they realize that most of the dignitaries have already been implanted due to bizarre behavior and Duncan being appointed director of the Royal Mint by the British Prime Minister (upon accepting this, Duncan cruelly states to Josephine that he is leaving her). They explain the truth to the other students, who perform for the guests and urge them to keep the world leaders from attending the G7 summit. They later proceeded to do so with an impromptu but rousing performance of War, accompanied by dancing and clapping from the assembled dignitaries and Queen Elizabeth herself, whilst Cody, Emily, and Derek search for the villains. Derek is implanted with the microchip and is set on Cody by Santiago. Before Santiago can kill him through Derek, Emily finds and subdues him, disabling the mind control software and rescuing the U.S. President, who was to be implanted.

Shortly after Cody kicks out Derek's microchip, the two of them remove the CIA director's microchip. Diaz, realizing that his plan has failed attempts to flee, ends up fighting, and being defeated by Cody in the Queen's gift room, destroying numerous priceless artifacts in the process. Duncan also attempts to escape but is tripped by Trivial Jenkins, his apparently senile and blind butler, who turns out to be Emily's handler. Duncan is arrested with Diaz and Santiago.

After the villains are arrested, Cody and Emily kiss each other on the cheek before Cody sets off to return to America. Both promised to keep in contact. Alongside Cody returning to America as a reward, Derek also returned to the camp and replaced Diaz as head counselor. Cody's parents pick him up, none the wiser about his dangerous exploits. Alex, Cody's younger brother tries to eat a few of his explosive Mentos, but Cody tosses them into the pond where they explode harmlessly.

Cast
 Frankie Muniz as Cody Banks, a 16-year-old teenager working for the CIA as an undercover junior agent                        
 Angie Harmon as Ronica Miles 
 Anthony Anderson as Derek Bowman, Cody's new agent partner 
 Hannah Spearritt as Emily Sommers, Cody's fellow orchestra student who is actually a British undercover operative
 Keith Allen as Victor Diaz, a rogue CIA agent who is in charge of a mind control program
 Cynthia Stevenson as Mrs. Banks, Cody's mother
 Daniel Roebuck as Mr. Banks, Cody's father
 Anna Chancellor as Lady Josephine Kensworth, a governess of the International Youth Orchestra
 James Faulkner as Lord Duncan Kensworth, a corrupt English businessman who is working for Diaz
 David Kelly as Trival Jenkins, a senile and blind butler who turns out to be Emily's handler
 Santiago Segura as Dr. Santiago, a dimwitted scientist who works with Diaz and Kenworth to try to take over the world
 Connor Widdows as Alex Banks, Cody's 11-year-old brother
 Keith David as the CIA Director
 Paul Kaye as Neville, Derek's hysterical and quirky assistant who helps Cody with a variety of gadgets
 Mark Williams as Inspector Crescent
 Rod Silvers as Kumar, Derek's right hand man
 Jack Stanley as Ryan
 Olivia Adams as Gabrielle
 Don Jones as George
 Joshua Brody as Bender
 Sarah McNicholas as Marisa
 Leilah Isaac as Sabeen – Bassoon Player
 Alfie Allen as Johan Berchamp
 Keiron Nelson as Habu – French Horn Player
 Ray Donn as Soldier (uncredited)

Production
The director of the first Cody Banks film, Harald Zwart, was initially poised to return but left over financial disagreements. MGM executives disputed Zwart’s figures, saying that twice they had bumped up the film’s budget during negotiations to meet his expectations. The proposed budget had moved north of $30 million, with the price rising moderately, as often happens with sequels. Director Kevin Allen was offered the directing job after MGM brass were impressed with his indie comedies. An executive mandate for the film was for less reliance on CGI setpieces and placing more emphasis on comedy with Allen said of the mandate, “If you ain’t got the money, make ’em laugh.” Agent Cody Banks 2: Destination London filmed in London and Cobham Hall in Kent where the Gilt Room doubled as the Queen's gift room at Buckingham Palace as Cody Banks (Frankie Muniz) fights Victor Diaz (Keith Allen) in a room full of treasures.

Reception 
Review aggregate Rotten Tomatoes gives the film a 14% "Rotten" rating based on 95 reviews, with an average score of 3.6/10. The site's consensus reads: "Young kids may find this London adventure fun, but older kids may find it too simplistic." On Metacritic, the film has a score of 32 out of 100 based on reviews from 25 critics, indicating "generally negative reviews." Audiences polled by CinemaScore gave the film an average grade of "B+" on an A+ to F scale.

Coming exactly one year after the first Cody Banks film, Agent Cody Banks 2: Destination London opened with only $8 million, compared to $14.1 million for its predecessor.

Possible sequel and spin-off 
While speaking with Steve-O, Frankie Muniz revealed that MGM had pitched to him two ideas for a family-friendly sequel and an adult oriented animated series. The sequel would feature Cody Banks training a group of new teenage spies while the series, described as being similar to BoJack Horseman, would feature Banks as a wash-up trying to regain his spy credibility from his youth.

References

External links
 
 
 

2004 films
2004 action comedy films
2000s adventure comedy films
2000s English-language films
2000s spy comedy films
2000s teen comedy films
20th Century Fox films
American action comedy films
American adventure comedy films
American sequel films
American spy comedy films
American teen comedy films
Films about the Central Intelligence Agency
Films about summer camps
Films directed by Kevin Allen
Films set in London
Metro-Goldwyn-Mayer films
Teen action films
Teen adventure films
2000s American films